The black-capped piprites (Piprites pileata), also known as the black-capped manakin, is a species of suboscine passerine. It has traditionally been placed in the Tyrannidae. 

It is found in Atlantic forest, especially with Araucaria angustifolia, growing in highlands of south-eastern Brazil and north-eastern Argentina (Misiones only). Until the recent rediscovery in Argentina, the only confirmed record for that country was a specimen taken in 1959. It is generally rare and local, and therefore considered vulnerable by BirdLife International. It is known from a number of protected areas, including the Itatiaia National Park in Rio de Janeiro, and Campos do Jordão State Park in São Paulo.

References

External links
 BirdLife species factsheet
 Photo of a male black-capped piprites - Jquental.

black-capped piprites
Birds of the Atlantic Forest
black-capped piprites
Taxonomy articles created by Polbot